The Williams FW33 was a Formula One racing car developed by Williams F1 for the 2011 Formula One season. It was driven by Brazilian veteran Rubens Barrichello and 2010 GP2 Series champion and rookie driver Pastor Maldonado. The car was shaken down at Silverstone on 28 January 2011, and made its full on-track debut at the Circuit Ricardo Tormo in Valencia, Spain, on 1 February 2011 in an interim testing livery. The definitive livery was released on 24 February, adding white, silver and red to the existing dark blue in a design directly inspired by the Rothmans livery used from 1994 to 1997.

Season review
During the course of the season, it became clear that the car was much less competitive than the Williams FW32 as the car tended to lack pace and struggled in races. Both drivers retired from the first two races of the season. In the next three races, both drivers finished, but failed to score any points. This made it the worst start to a season in the history of the Williams team. Monaco saw an improvement in the team's fortunes as Barrichello finished 9th. It could have been a double points finish for the team, but Maldonado retired after a collision with Lewis Hamilton, but was classified in 18th place after finishing more than 90% of the race. The same result also occurred in the chaotic 2011 Canadian Grand Prix where Barrichello finished 9th and Maldonado again retired after he spun off during the race. No more points were to come for the team until Spa, where Maldonado scored his first point with tenth place.

Gallery

Complete Formula One results
(key) (results in bold indicate pole position; results in italics indicate fastest lap)

 Driver failed to finish the race, but was classified as they had completed >90% of the race distance.

References

External links

Williams Formula One cars